Teen Spirit is the second studio album by the Swedish pop group A-Teens. It was released on 26 February 2001 by Stockholm Records. It was the group's first album of original material. The album was recorded in Sweden with new producers and hitmakers Grizzly and Tysper, among others. While musically it is generally perceived to be more American-driven than the Europop sound of their first album, it does include a varied mix of styles including soul and Latin music. Three singles were released from the album, "Upside Down", "Halfway Around the World" and "Sugar Rush". A new version of the album including bonus tracks was released on 21 January 2002 in Scandinavia, Germany and Mexico. While not repeating the same level of success as their first album, the album went on to sell over 1.5 million copies, despite receiving poor reviews from critics.

Critical reception

In a mixed review of the album, Billboard said that the group "strive to establish themselves as a durable entity with a baker's dozen's worth of featherlight ditties that range in quality from guilty pleasures to already-dated clunkers". On a positive note, the review said that "Bouncing Off the Ceiling (Upside Down)" and "…To the Music" "have an undeniably sunny charm that will tickle the fancy of some preteens" and that "Halfway Around the World" "could actually draw the attention of grown-ups hungry for a sugary diversion", but overall the album "is a collection of more misses than hits". Writing for AllMusic, Jon Azpiri gave the album one out of five stars, saying that "some people just don’t know when to quit" and that on this album "instead of blatantly ripping off ABBA, they choose to imitate the trademark sound of ubiquitous Swedish pop super-producer Max Martin". Laut gave the album two out of five stars, criticizing the music’s similarities to recent hits by 'NSync, the Backstreet Boys and Britney Spears, but said, "At least the happy mood is still reminiscent of ABBA." In a negative review, J.R. Griffin of Rolling Stone said that "without the nostalgic ABBA tunes on their side, the A-Teens have demoted themselves to the level of S Club 7, a younger Ace of Base and god-forbid, Aqua. This sappy stuff will only appeal to the youngest of kids known for cranking Radio Disney on a continual basis." Writing for Sonic.net, Paul Gaita gave the album its highest rating, two and a half out of five stars, and said that if the group "intend to make good on the threat of their final track and come "Back for More," they'll need to work twice as hard to dispel both the ghosts of [ABBA] and this new straight-outta-IKEA personality as well." Writing for Wall of Sound, Gary Graff also criticized the similarities between the album's production and recent Max Martin produced efforts and gave the album a score of 40 out of 100. He praised group members Amit and Dhani for taking a more prominent role this time out, saying that the group achieve a few ABBA-esque moments on the lush pop pieces "Sugar Rush" and "Back for More".

Commercial performance
The album peaked at No. 2 in Sweden on the Sverigetopplistan Albums Top 60 chart, No. 18 in Austria on the Ö3 Austria Top 40 Top Albums chart, No. 33 in Finland on the Official Finnish Charts Top 50 Albums chart, No. 5 in Germany on the GfK Entertainment Top 100 Albums chart, No. 5 in the Netherlands on the Dutch Top 40, No. 37 in Norway on the VG-lista Top 40 Albums chart, No. 13 in Switzerland on the Swiss Hitparade Top 100 Albums chart, and No. 50 in the United States on the Billboard 200.

The album was certified Gold in Sweden and the United States.

Track listing

The track "Upside Down" was renamed "Bouncing Off the Ceiling (Upside Down)" on North American pressings of the album.
The track "Morning Light" is a cover of a song by E-Type from the album Last Man Standing.

Charts

Weekly charts

Year-end charts

Certifications and sales

Release history

References

External links
Rate Your Music Review

A-Teens albums
Albums produced by RedOne
2001 albums